The 2003–04 Euroleague was the fourth season of the professional basketball  competition for elite clubs throughout Europe, organised by Euroleague Basketball Company, and it was the 47th season of the premier competition for European men's clubs overall. The 2003–04 season featured 24 competing teams from 13 countries. The final of the competition was held in Nokia Arena, Tel Aviv, Israel, with hosts Maccabi Elite Tel Aviv, defeating Skipper Bologna, by a score of 118-74.

Regular season
The first phase was a regular season, in which the competing teams were drawn into three groups, each containing eight teams. Each team played every other team in its group at home and away, resulting in 14 games for each team in the first stage. The top 5 teams in each group and the best sixth-placed team advanced to the next round. The complete list of tiebreakers was provided in the lead-in to the Regular Season results.

If one or more clubs were level on won-lost record, tiebreakers were applied in the following order:
Head-to-head record in matches between the tied clubs
Overall point difference in games between the tied clubs
Overall point difference in all group matches (first tiebreaker if tied clubs were not in the same group)
Points scored in all group matches
Sum of quotients of points scored and points allowed in each group match

Group C

Top 16
The surviving teams were divided into four groups of four teams each, and again a round robin system was adopted resulting in 6 games each, with the top team advancing to the Final Four. Tiebreakers were identical to those used in the Regular Season.

This was the last season in which teams advanced directly from the Top 16 to the Final Four. A quarterfinal round was introduced in the 2004–05 season.

The draw was held in accordance with Euroleague rules.

The teams were placed into four pools, as follows:

Level 1: The three group winners, plus the top-ranked second-place team
 CSKA Moscow, FC Barcelona, Maccabi Elite Tel Aviv, Efes Pilsen
Level 2: The remaining second-place teams, plus the top two third-place teams
 Skipper Bologna, Pamesa Valencia, Benetton Treviso, Cibona
Level 3: The remaining third-place team, plus the three fourth-place teams
 Union Olimpija, Ülker, Montepaschi Siena, Tau Cerámica
Level 4: The fifth-place teams, plus the top ranked sixth-place team
 Pau-Orthez, Panathinaikos, Olympiacos, Žalgiris

Each Top 16 group included one team from each pool. The draw was conducted under the following restrictions:
No more than two teams from the same Regular Season group could be placed in the same Top 16 group.
No more than two teams from the same country could be placed in the same Top 16 group.
If there is a conflict between these two restrictions, (1) would receive priority.

Another draw was held to determine the order of fixtures. In the case of two teams from the same city in the Top 16 (Panathinaikos and Olympiacos, Efes Pilsen and Ülker) they were scheduled so that every week only one team would be at home.

Final four

Semifinals
April 29, Nokia Arena, Tel Aviv

|}

3rd place game
May 1, Nokia Arena, Tel Aviv

|}

Final
May 1, Nokia Arena, Tel Aviv

|}

Final standings

Awards

Top Scorer
 Lynn Greer (  Śląsk Wrocław )

Regular Season MVP
 Arvydas Sabonis (  Žalgiris )

Top 16 MVP
 Arvydas Sabonis (  Žalgiris )

Final Four MVP
 Anthony Parker (  Maccabi Elite Tel Aviv )

Finals Top Scorer
 Anthony Parker (  Maccabi Elite Tel Aviv ) &  Miloš Vujanić (  Skipper Bologna )

All-Euroleague First Team 2003–04
 Šarūnas Jasikevičius (  Maccabi Elite Tel Aviv )
 Marcus Brown (  CSKA Moscow )
 Dejan Bodiroga (  FC Barcelona )
 Mirsad Türkcan (  CSKA Moscow )
 Arvydas Sabonis (  Žalgiris )

All-Euroleague Second Team 2003–04
 Miloš Vujanić (  Skipper Bologna )
 Lynn Greer (  Śląsk Wrocław )
 David Vanterpool (  Montepaschi Siena )
 Andrés Nocioni (  Tau Cerámica )
 Nikola Vujčić (  Maccabi Elite Tel Aviv )

References and notes

External links
Euroleague.net - Official Euroleague homepage.
Eurobasket.com - Popular basketball news site.
TalkBasket.net - Basketball forum.

 
 
EuroLeague seasons